The men's Greco-Roman 120 kilograms is a competition featured at the 2005 World Wrestling Championships, and was held at the László Papp Budapest Sports Arena in Budapest, Hungary on 2 October 2005.

This Greco-Roman wrestling competition consists of a single-elimination tournament, with a repechage used to determine the winner of two bronze medals.

Results
Legend
C — Won by 3 cautions given to the opponent
F — Won by fall

Final

Top half

Bottom half

Repechage

References

Men's Greco-Roman 99 kg